The Type 760 Westerwald-class replenishment ship was a class of two replenishment ships of the German Navy. They are commissioned from 1967 to 2010. Their main task was to transport ammunition and material for warships at sea.

Development 
As part of the auxiliary ship program of 1959, drafts for the construction of Type 706 ammunition transporters were drawn up in 1963/64. At the end of 1964, the Orenstein & Koppel shipyard in Lübeck received the order to build two Type 706 ships.

In the mid-1980s, the two ammunition transporters received the complete package for maneuvering, consisting of a transverse thrust system, Becker rudder and GUY reduction gear. The supply stations on the Westerwald were subsequently enlarged, and external platforms that could be folded out to the side were installed.

Armaments were only available during the time with a military crew on board.

The Odenwald was mainly used for the transport of MM-38 missiles to and from Brest / France. The Westerwald was used as a supplier in addition to transporting ammunition. In many cases, he was deployed as a supplier in speedboat or minesweeping squadrons when the tender subordinate to the squadrons was not available.

The two ships were officially reclassified as utilities in the 1990s. The Westerwald received Type 760A and the Odenwald received Type 760B.

Ships of class

Citations

Auxiliary transport ship classes
Auxiliary ships of Germany
Auxiliary ships of the German Navy